David Eldar (born c. 1990) is an Australian Scrabble player and poker player who specializes in Omaha hold 'em. He is the World Scrabble Champion of 2017, sweeping Harshan Lamabadusuriya 3-0 in the final.

Education 
Eldar attended the King David School in Armadale, an eastern suburb of Melbourne.

Scrabble 
His Scrabble achievements include:

Youth
World Youth Scrabble Champion 2006
Australian National Champion (2007, 2013)
Victorian State Champion 2003
Runner-up Australian Masters (2005, 2006, 2007)
11th Place World Scrabble Championship 2005
11th Place World Scrabble Championship 2007
2008 Causeway Challenge Champion

Open
North American Scrabble Championship 2016 Collins Division Winner (USD 2,500)
World Scrabble Championship 2017 Winner (GBP 7,500)

Poker
Eldar plays under the alias Deldar182 on PokerStars and has earned over $1,800,000, as of April 2018.

Eldar finished 5th in the 2009 European High Roller Championship No Limit Hold'em event winnings $181,450. As of 2018, his total live tournaments cashes exceeds $200,000.

References

External links
Profile

No SQUIT when it comes to Scrabble
World Youth Scrabble championships

Living people
Australian Scrabble players
Australian poker players
Year of birth missing (living people)